Odontomantis is a genus of mantids in the family Hymenopodidae; species can be found in tropical Asia.

Species
The Mantodea Species File lists:
 Odontomantis brachyptera Zheng, 1989
 Odontomantis buhleri Beier, 1952
 Odontomantis chayuensis Zheng, 1989
 Odontomantis euphrosyne Stal, 1877
 Odontomantis foveafrons Zhang, 1985
 Odontomantis hainana Tinkham, 1937
 Odontomantis laticollis Beier, 1933
 Odontomantis longipennis Zheng, 1989
 Odontomantis micans Saussure, 1871
 Odontomantis montana Giglio-Tos, 1915
 Odontomantis monticola Beier, 1933
 Odontomantis nigrimarginalis Zhang, 1985
 Odontomantis ornata Werner, 1935
 Odontomantis parva Giglio-Tos, 1915
 Odontomantis planiceps Haan, 1842; synonym O. javana Saussure, 1870
 Odontomantis pulchra Olivier, 1792; synonyms O. caffraria Lichtenstein, 1802; O. flavicincta Olivier, 1792; O. marginalis Stoll, 1813
 Odontomantis rhyssa Werner, 1930
 Odontomantis sinensis Giglio-Tos, 1915
 Odontomantis xizangensis Zheng, 1989

Gallery

References

External links

Hymenopodidae
Mantodea genera